Convery is a surname. Notable people with the surname include:

Aileen Convery (born 1969), Irish swimmer
Brandon Convery (born 1974), Canadian ice hockey player
Christian Convery (born 2009), Canadian actor
Gerry Convery (born 1955), Canadian darts player
Mark Convery (born 1981), English footballer
Michaela Convery (born 1989), Irish camogie player
Ruairí Convery (born 1984), Northern Ireland hurler
Steve Convery (born 1972), Scottish footballer